Rachel Anne Summers (also known as Rachel Grey) is a fictional character appearing in American comic books published by Marvel Comics. The character was created by writer Chris Claremont and artist/co-plotter John Byrne.

In her first appearance, the character's surname was not revealed; in later appearances, she was established as the daughter of the alternate future counterparts to Cyclops and Jean Grey-Summers from the dystopian Days of Future Past timeline, making her the sister of Nate Grey and half sister of Cable as well as the niece of Havok and Vulcan. Although she is considered a unique multiversal anomaly with no alternate-universe counterparts, this has been contradicted by references to her stated relationships to certain characters in other dimensions.

The character is a mutant with similar abilities to her mother, including telepathy, telekinesis, and a connection to the Phoenix, the latter of which was represented in her adoption of the Phoenix title after her mother's apparent death. Throughout her publication history, she has also been referred to by the monikers Marvel Girl, Prestige, and Mother Askani, most recently taking on the codename Askani.

Publication history

Rachel first appeared in The Uncanny X-Men #141 (Jan. 1981) and has since been affiliated with several comic book superhero teams including the X-Men and Excalibur.

In 2022, she joined the Knights of X team as part of the Destiny of X era under the leadership of Captain Britain, who takes a group of mutants under her wing leading them into the Otherworld. The title was the follow-up to the 2019's Excalibur relaunch and was written by Tini Howard. In its fourth issue, Rachel Summers and her long-time friend Betsy Braddock confessed their romantic feelings for each other and their kiss was shown in a splash page.

Fictional character biography

Future adolescence

Rachel Anne Summers comes from an alternate future Earth known as Earth-811, as seen in the "Days of Future Past" storyline from The Uncanny X-Men #141–142. In this reality, the assassination of Senator Robert Kelly provoked the ratification of the Mutant Registration Act, leading to a dystopian future where the mutant-hunting Sentinel robots rule North America. Rachel was abducted by operatives working for Ahab, who used drugs and hypnotherapy to turn Rachel into a "Hound", a mutant who tracks down other mutants. She fulfilled her duties, but her psychic powers linked her to her victims; fueling her grief and despair until she attacked Ahab and scarred him. In return, he sent her to the mutant concentration camps. There, she befriended the surviving mutant rebels, including Wolverine, Magneto, Colossus, Storm, Kate Pryde, and her lover, the adult Franklin Richards.

Rachel managed to send Kate's consciousness into the past to her younger self to prevent the assassination, but it did not change their time. Rachel sent her astral form into the past to find out why and discovered she had sent Kate into an alternate past. On the way back, she encountered the disembodied Phoenix Force and it followed her to her present. Rachel passed out from the strain of astral projection and the Phoenix Force revealed itself to Kate, who asked it to give Rachel a fresh start.

When Rachel and Kate broke into "Project: Nimrod" on a suicide mission to destroy a new model of Sentinel, they became trapped. When Kate spoke the words "Dark Phoenix," the Phoenix Force ripped Rachel from her timeline and sent her body back to the alternate past to which she had sent Kate's consciousness. This was a past where she learned Jean Grey was dead and that her father was married to someone else. Rachel experienced additional heartache and displacement trauma when she discovered that her father's new wife, Madelyne Pryor, was pregnant with a son (Nathan Summers), because in her timeline she was the first-born child of Scott Summers.

X-Men
Rachel had a brief membership in the X-Men before finding a Shi'ar holoempathic crystal at her grandparents' home. The crystal was imprinted with a portion of Rachel's mother's essence inside it as a tribute to the family shortly after Jean Grey's death. After Rachel took a vow to remember her mother with the uniform and name of Phoenix, the Phoenix Force fully bonded with her. She was granted access to its power on a cosmic magnitude, albeit in a much more limited fashion than the Dark Phoenix. Soon after, the grudge which she had begun with Selene boiled over when Rachel secretly invaded the Hellfire Club. She did this with the intention of taking vengeance on Selene for the murders she had committed, particularly that of nightclub owner Nicholas Damiano, who had previously taken Rachel into his home after Selene had attacked her. Selene proved to be no match for Rachel's newly increased powers, but just as she was about to finish Selene, Wolverine arrived and was forced to stab Rachel in the chest. Critically injured, Rachel was lured into Spiral's "Body Shoppe."

Excalibur

Months later, while recuperating from injuries on Muir Island, Shadowcat and Nightcrawler both had the same dream, where they were actors on a weird set and helped Rachel, who was trapped there, escape. Shortly thereafter, Rachel escaped from the alternate reality of Mojoworld. Rachel has once been cited having a flashback to her time there where she is held in chains and tortured. The three former X-Men were joined by Captain Britain and Meggan and founded the British superhero team Excalibur. While part of the team, she discovered that this universe's version of her mother, Jean Grey, was alive. She attempted to bond with Jean, but Jean, upon discovering Rachel was the present host for the Phoenix, rejected any contact with her. Jean still resented the Phoenix Force for stealing a portion of her life. She also rejected Rachel because she felt that Rachel's existence was a constant reminder of the dystopian future she feared could still come to pass. Eventually, however, Jean moved past those feelings and formally welcomed Rachel into her life.

Askani
Rachel remained with Excalibur until an incident caused Captain Britain to be lost in the timestream. She exchanged places with the time-lost Captain Britain and emerged two thousand years in the future, in a world conquered by Apocalypse and crushed under his iron fist. She gathered together a group of rebels and founded the Askani. She trained one of her followers to travel back in time and bring her "brother" Nathan forward in time when he was infected with a techno-organic virus. The Askani cloned Nathan in case he was not able to survive the virus. Apocalypse's followers attacked the Askani and took the clone (who would later become the supervillain Stryfe), leaving Rachel critically injured. Hooked up to life support, she drew the minds of Scott and Jean into the future, as "Slym" and "Redd", to raise Nathan and tutor him in the use of his powers. Rachel finally died ten years later and sent Scott and Jean back to their original bodies seconds after they had left.

After Nathan, now known as Cable, had finally defeated Apocalypse, he went into the timeline to retrieve Rachel. There, he discovered a Rachel sans Phoenix Force. With the premature death of Apocalypse, the Askani timeline had been diverged from the mainstream Marvel Universe, Earth-616. As a result, she had been flung into the far future, yet subjectively a short time after she had been lost in the timestream, as the slave of a creature called "Gaunt", who had used her to lead Cable there for a "battle of the ages". Cable defeated Gaunt in the battle and Rachel, now free, was able to use her residual Phoenix Force to return them both to the present. She then decided to take a break from superheroics and enrolled in college after she made Cable promise he would not tell anyone she was back. Despite her efforts to live a normal life, however, she was kidnapped by the telepath Elias Bogan and subsequently rescued by the X-Men.

Rachel Grey
She decided to rejoin the X-Men, taking the name "Marvel Girl" to honor her mother (who had recently died yet again) and wearing a costume her mother had designed but never worn: a variation on Jean's first green costume. She also changed her last name to "Grey", possibly to express disapproval at her father's betrayal of Jean, as well as his continuing relationship with Emma Frost; though she and Emma made a truce of sorts during one of the team's missions in Hong Kong. Rachel and Nightcrawler began to have an attraction towards each other, kissing at one point, but nothing came of it as Nightcrawler also had an attraction to Storm at the time, who was in somewhat of a romantic "friendship" with Wolverine. Her stint with this team also included a visit to the Savage Land. In the storyline "World's End", which was heavily criticized by readers, Rachel was subjected to the mind-control of a tribe of advanced dinosaur people, the Hauk'ka, causing her to believe she belonged to their species. Afterward, she subconsciously used her telekinesis to change her own genome in their image. This was eventually reverted. After House of M and Decimation, where most of the world's mutants lost their powers, the government had Sentinels instituted at the X-Mansion to protect the mutants in case any enemies used this low point to attack. Though their intentions were good this time, it reminded Rachel too much of the previous timeline when Sentinels herded mutants into concentration camps.

Rachel had a short stint with newly re-formed Excalibur, reminiscent of the former team, shortly after the House of M events. She assisted the team in battling Shadow-X and the Shadow King (in the guise of Professor X).

End of Greys

Rachel spent some time with her grandparents, bonding with her grandfather. At a family reunion with all her relatives, a commando unit under the order of the Shi'ar attacked the party, killing everyone in an effort to wipe out the Grey genome. The commando unit was unable to kill Rachel; instead, one member was able to graft a "deathmark" on her back that would allow them to find her wherever she went. It is assumed that the only remaining member of the Grey family now left on Earth besides Rachel is Cable. Afterward, at the graves of the Grey family, Rachel vowed a terrible vengeance on the Shi'ar and was quoted as saying, "I'm not my mom. I'm not the Phoenix. I'm my own woman. And by the time I'm done... they'll wish I was the Phoenix."

The Death Commandos later tracked Rachel to the psychiatry office of Dr. Maureen Lyszinski. Rachel, with the help of Psylocke, Nightcrawler, Bishop, and Cannonball, saved the doctor and took down the Death Commandos. She decided to imprison them, instead of killing them, by telling them, "I mean to find destiny in a way that brings us both [Jean Grey] honor." She is also sometimes referenced as "Starchilde" in this series.

Rise and Fall of the Shi'ar Empire
After Rachel was kidnapped, along with Cyclops, by her paternal uncle Vulcan, he freed Darwin from inside him. Later, Professor X recruited Rachel, along with Havok, Nightcrawler, Warpath, Darwin, and Polaris, for a space mission to stop Vulcan from laying waste to the Shi'ar empire. Xavier, who recently was stripped of his powers, recruited Rachel to serve as his telepathic "eyes and ears" during their mission. Aware of Rachel's vendetta against the Shi'ar, Xavier agreed to use their trip into space to find out who in the Shi'ar Empire gave the order to wipe out all members of the Grey family, and he warned Rachel that they will deal with the people responsible for her recent losses Xavier's way.

While in space, the team was attacked by Korvus, a Shi'ar warrior sent to kill Rachel. Korvus' ancestor, Rook'shir, was a previous host of the Phoenix Force, and a small portion of the Phoenix's power was left behind in his sword, the Blade of the Phoenix. With this power, Korvus made short work of the other X-Men, but when Rachel blocked the sword, their minds were involuntarily linked. Through this link, Rachel learned that Korvus' family was also murdered by the Shi'ar government because of their connection to the Phoenix. The remaining echo of the Phoenix power from the sword was then transferred to Rachel. Rachel claimed that rather than having taken the power, the power chose to go to her, saying, "The Phoenix knows me, remember? It likes me." When this happened, Rachel's normally gold energy aura turned blue, the same color as the Blade of the Phoenix. She then telekinetically disabled an explosive implant that the Shi'ar chancellor was using to force Korvus' obedience.

Due to Rachel's connection to Korvus through the sword, she discovers the Phoenix Force formerly in the blade is just an echo, a "blue shadow", of the Force. The shadow of the Phoenix begins influencing Rachel's behavior, causing her to design a new darker uniform and begin a romance with Korvus. She soon breaks off the relationship after she realizes their bond is only because of the residual Phoenix Force.

Leading up to the fight with Vulcan, Rachel is shown using her powers to kill the guards who stand in her way. Havok warns her not to, but Rachel tells him that they deserve to die after what they did to her family. When it comes to the big fight, Rachel shows just how powerful she is by protecting Korvus from one of Vulcan's blasts. Rachel is one of the X-Men stranded in Shi'ar space when their ship is sent back to Earth.

After the death of her other grandfather, Corsair, at the hands of Vulcan, she, along with Havok, Polaris, Korvus, Ch'od, and Raza, become the new Starjammers. They elect to remain in Shi'ar space and restore Lilandra to the throne or die trying. As her uncle states, "If they fail, he has no doubt that Vulcan will head for Earth."

Starjammers
During the conflict, the Starjammers find another threat in the form of the Scy'ar Tal (translates as "Death to the Shi'ar"). Rachel makes contact with the eldest Scy'ar Tal and discovers their true origin. The Scy'ar Tal were originally called the M'Kraan. Early in their history, the Shi`ar attacked them, killing a great number of their people and making the rest flee for their lives. Eventually, the Shi'ar settled on their planet, took the M'Kraan Crystal as their own, and passed down the legend of the M'Kraan Crystal as a sacred gift from their deities, Sharra and K'ythri. The M'Kraan then changed their name to Scy'ar Tal and devoted their culture and society to the destruction of the Shi`ar Empire. With their first attack, they destroyed Feather's Edge by transporting a star to obliterate it. After which, Vulcan made contact with the Starjammers to call a temporary ceasefire.

During the ceasefire, Rachel comes into contact with the Death Commandos again and attempts to kill them to avenge the deaths of her relatives; however, she is deterred by Polaris. In the end, all the Starjammers are captured by the Shi'ar except Rachel, Korvus, and Lilandra.

X-Men: Kingbreaker and War of Kings
Rachel and the Starjammers play a large role in the sequel to the Emperor Vulcan miniseries called X-Men: Kingbreaker. She is also seen prominently in the "War of Kings" storyline, which features Vulcan, the Inhumans, Nova, and the Guardians of the Galaxy.

While with the Starjammers, in battle with Vulcan's new guard, the fragment of the "blue" Phoenix within her and Korvus' blade mysteriously leaves them. After the Phoenix echo leaves Rachel, she says "please... not now.... Mom." From this frame onward, the "hound" markings reappear on Rachel's face.

In agreement with the Inhumans, the Starjammers and the Guardians of the Galaxy assault a Shi'ar vessel in order to free Lilandra, hoping to end the conflict while restoring her to the throne. Even without her Phoenix powers, Rachel is powerful enough to entrap Gladiator in an illusion in order to keep him distracted from battle. Their gambit pays off and the group is able to free Lilandra.

Rachel is next seen as Lilandra's bodyguard along with the rest of the Starjammers. On the home planet of the Shi'ar, Lilandra assumes her throne, but while making a ceremonial gesture is killed by the murderer known as Razor, who possesses the Darkhawk armor. The only person who perceives this is Rachel, since Razor is shielded from the perceptions of others.

After Lilandra is assassinated, Rachel fights alongside the Starjammers against the Shi'ar Guard and Araki, who has summoned the same Shi'ar commandos that killed Rachel's family and branded her with the Shi'ar death mark. Rachel uses her powers to implode Black Cloak's head, saying, "He was the one... He killed my family," though killing him does not make her feel happier. Gladiator finishes the job by killing Araki himself. Rachel, along with the rest of the Starjammers, regroup later on and mourn the Shi'ar, as they doubt that they will recover from this war.

Realm of Kings
It is known through Ch'od, and apparently due to the incident where she and Korvus both lost the connection to the Phoenix Force, that Rachel and Korvus, along with Havok and Polaris, have departed for Earth.

Age of X
While on the way back to Earth, Rachel attempted to contact Professor Xavier or Emma Frost with a message. However at that moment, Moira (a powerful alternate personality of the mutant Legion) warped reality taking Rachel's mind with it creating the amnesic Revenant. Once reality was restored, Rachel's mind is separated from her body which according to her is "half a universe away". Because of Moira's actions, Rachel no longer remembers the message and her mind retains the form of her Age of X counterpart. Scott promised her that they would return her home.

Schism and Regenesis
Rachel reappears in Schism. She asks Rogue to connect with her to see what will happen. When the two of them touch, Rogue sees a vision of where Rachel, Havok and Polaris are as Rachel then returns to her body. When she awakens she is met by an unseen villain holding a gun and telling her he has killed her friends.

Borrowing one of Legion's manifold powers, Rogue teleports alongside Gambit, Magneto and Frenzy to rescue their teammates on the other side of the galaxy. Once there, Rachel is retrieved from a band of pirates as Rogue becomes their new leader. The remaining X-Men discover they've arrived at a space station called Gul Damar which is in a state of upheaval due to the rebellion of insectoid creatures called Grad Nan Holt against their Shi'ar enslavers. They are also being pulled into an exploding sun and the entire civil war is revealed to be orchestrated by a powerful Grad Nan Holt telepath known as "Friendless." A number of battles with the creature proves unsuccessful for Rachel, but with the combined efforts of Rogue and the X-Men they are able to defeat him and return home via the wormhole that was created from the collapsing star.

Rachel as part of a team of Wolverine's X-Men attempted to psychically battle Exodus in an attempt to prevent the assassination of Cyclops. The team is eventually beaten and the X-Men are saved by Generation Hope.

Rachel is then invited to hold a position as senior staff member of the "Jean Grey School for Higher Learning," which was rebuilt from the Xavier Institute and has Wolverine as acting Headmaster and Kitty Pryde as Headmistress.

Avengers vs. X-Men
During the events of AVX, when the X-Men on Utopia escape from the invading Avengers, Rachel contacts Cyclops to provide Hope's location. Afterwards, Rachel states that she knows the Phoenix Force better than anyone else on Earth and that she is living proof that it can be controlled. She also says that if the Phoenix has chosen her and that is the destiny that Hope wants, she will do everything in her power to help her. She and Iceman tell Wolverine at the school that they are going to help Cyclops in the battle. However, when Cyclops and Emma Frost begin to be corrupted by the Phoenix's power, she, like the other X-Men, decide to oppose their rule. Rachel then battled against Cyclops and helped both the Avengers and X-Men in the final battle.

Marvel NOW! and Inhuman war
In 2013, Marvel revealed an all new all female series simply named X-Men. Written by Brian Wood with art by Olivier Coipel, X-Men will feature an all female cast including Storm, Jubilee, Rogue, Kitty Pryde, Rachel Grey and Psylocke.

The X-Men are in pursuit of Arkea who has attempted to revive the X-Men's long lost enemies. The X-Men are attacked by the newly formed Sisterhood and Rachel is telepathically locked down by Madelyne Pryor. Storm strikes a deal for Rachels freedom allowing Madelyne and Selene to walk free.

In the AXIS story arc, Storm sends the entire student body against the Red Onslaught in an attempt to save Earth. Rachel is shown to be reverted to her hound form by Dr. Doom and Wanda Maximoffs spell.

Rachel is part of Storm's team of Amazing X-Men who attempts to stop the Living Monolith from becoming the new Juggernaut.

Rachel Grey is distrusting of Spider-Man's newly appointed position as Jean Grey School guidance counsellor. Using her telepathy she seeks to expose his secret identity only to lose that memory by being mind-wiped by Martha Johansson.

Rachel is shown as a teacher at the Jean Grey Institute in the battle against Kenji.

ResurrXion
When Kitty Pryde returns from space to lead the X-Men, Rachel joins her team in X-Men Gold and adopts the unique, new code name Prestige.

Dawn of X
In the new status quo for mutants post House of X and Powers of X, Professor X and Magneto invite all mutants to live on Krakoa and welcome even former enemies into their fold. Rachel spends some time with her family on the Summer House, the new residence of the Summers Family, located on the Moon. Soon after X (Xavier) is killed by bioengineered human terrorists, Cyclops gathers Rachel and Kid Cable for a mission on the Atlantic Ocean regarding a piece of their new homeland of Krakoa.

Later, she joins Polaris, Daken, Northstar and former X-students Eye-Boy and Prodigy in a new initiative in Krakoa: they are to investigate any mutant death and prepare a report for The Five as part of the Resurrection Protocols of Krakoa. Their first case involves the supposed death of Northstar's twin sister, Aurora.

Powers and abilities
Rachel possesses various psionic abilities, generally exhibited through telepathy, psychometry, telekinesis, and limited time manipulation.

Telepathy
Rachel's "virtually unlimited" telepathy allows her to receive, broadcast, and manipulate cognitive processes (such as thoughts) in an intricate manner. Examples of Rachel's aptitudes for this include creating durable mind-links across distances, projecting blasts of psionic energy that disrupt aspects of brain functioning, shielding her mind from other telepaths, creating illusions, and rendering someone imperceptible to the five senses. In addition, Rachel has demonstrated the ability to telepathically suppress superpowers; control, repair, and exchange minds; as well as safely editing memories. Rachel has also harnessed her telepathy to sense, locate, and track other sentient beings based on their thought patterns, but has a moral apprehension about using this skill due to her experiences as a Hound.

It has been suggested that Rachel's telepathy, although immeasurable in raw power, is mitigated by her limited training and finesse. Emma Frost was able to outflank an incredulous Rachel in a contest on the astral plane. In the same issue, Emma offered her educative services; and later still, Rachel received training from Professor Charles Xavier (while he was depowered), giving her access to his vast knowledge and expertise in telepathy.

Telekinesis
By using telekinesis, Marvel Girl can remotely manipulate matter even on a sub-atomic level. She can channel this ability to create protective force fields and blasts of concussive force. By using her telekinesis to levitate herself, Marvel Girl can fly at incredible speeds. Rachel has been able to create a micro black hole, levitate an entire city for a time, sustain shields that withstood Jovian atmospheric pressures, and direct blows from Thor's hammer, Mjolnir. Moreover, Rachel's telekinetic fine-motor control has allowed her to alter molecular valences, mentally alter clothing with ease, create a telekinetic/psionic sword (much like Psylocke's telekinetic katana), a telekinetic hammer powerful enough to knock Thor off his feet, and even rewrite human genomes.

While all depictions portray Rachel as an extremely powerful telekinetic, the limitations of her hard-psi capabilities have been somewhat inconsistent. Some instances have depicted Rachel's telekinetic potential to be nigh-unlimited, whereas others have shown her struggling against, and even outmatched by, lesser developed telekinetics such as Psylocke.

Chronoskimming
Marvel Girl utilizes her psionic talents in conjunction with her ability to manipulate time in a variety of ways. "Chronoskimming" describes her ability to temporarily transplant a person's mind and send it through time into a younger/older version, a close ancestor/descendant, or as a disembodied astral form.
Rachel unconsciously emanates a fourth dimensional pulse, effectively creating a chrono-shield that protects her from changes in the timeline. She can also sense and manipulate residual psychic energy in the form of psychometry.

Phoenix Force
When Rachel was bonded to the cosmic entity known as the Phoenix Force, she demonstrated heightened psi-powers, the ability to manipulate energy and life-forces, and limited cosmic awareness. Rachel's connection to the Phoenix power was lost in the distant future and did not return with her when she traveled back to the early 21st century (present) of Earth-616 (Marvel's mainstream universe).

Most recently, Marvel Girl absorbed a residual echo of the Phoenix Force left in the sword of a previous host, a Shi'ar named Rook'shir. It was revealed that this energy source was a less powerful (but easier to wield) form of the Phoenix Force. The echo was powerful enough to allow Rachel to survive in and fly through the vacuum of space without the need for additional protection, as well as being able to hold her own in combat against the tremendous physical power of Gladiator. These demonstrations were short lived, however, due to its disappearance, which Rachel attributes to Jean Grey. She now exhibits her standard power levels.

Power signature
As a host for the Phoenix Force, Rachel manifested the cosmic firebird in displays of great power. During her 2000s Uncanny X-Men appearances, Marvel Girl also exhibited a Phoenix emblem over her left eye whenever she demonstrated psionic feats. It was at first accompanied by a "shadow form" (similar to the one Jean Grey manifested when she absorbed the telepathic powers of Psylocke). However, the illustration of this shadow form ceased without explanation. After regaining a small portion of the Phoenix Force (echo), the emblem over her eye changed from a gold Phoenix shape to a static version made of electric blue flame. Her display of power was once more altered in X-Men: Emperor Vulcan #3, where she produced the familiar fiery raptor with which the Phoenix Force is commonly associated (see profile image).

Skills and abilities
At times, Rachel has been shown to learn new skills extremely quickly. For example, she mastered a set of "demon ninja" sword skills simply by watching her teammate Shadowcat perform them. Along with sword fighting, Rachel has experience in lock-picking, vehicular repair (such as engines), and use of advanced technology and weaponry. However, these abilities have not been evident in her more recent appearances.

Potential and limitations
Rachel's power level and scope of abilities have been inconsistently described by writers over the years. However, she is usually depicted with "virtually unlimited" potential in her dual psionic talents. In most cases, she displayed greater feats as the Phoenix and even matched Gladiator's strength with the aid of a "Phoenix echo". Rachel is considered by many to be an Omega-level mutant (like her mother), but the only literary reference to this attribute is when the future Sentinel, Nimrod, classified Rachel as an "Omega class subject" several years before the term was established in Marvel canon.

Even with the omnipotent strength of the Phoenix, magic and magical objects are able to resist Rachel's powers. When the Soulsword appeared near the Excalibur lighthouse headquarters seeking Kitty Pryde to become its new wielder, Rachel attempted to remove it from bedrock to alleviate her friend's apprehension. Despite using the full extent of power permitted by the Phoenix Force, Rachel was unable to remove the sword, surmising that only Kitty could remove it.

Reception

Accolades 

 In 2014, Entertainment Weekly ranked Rachel Summers 98th in their "Let's rank every X-Man ever" list.
 In 2018, CBR.com ranked Rachel Summers 4th in their "X-Men: The Strongest Members Of The Summers Family" list.
 In 2018, CBR.com ranked Phoenix/Rachel Summers 13th in their "8 X-Men Kids Cooler Than Their Parents (And 7 Who Are Way Worse)" list.
 In 2018, CBR.com ranked Rachel Summers 3rd in their "20 Most Powerful Mutants From The '80s" list.
 In 2019, CBR.com ranked Rachel Summers 1st in their "X-Men: The 10 Most Dangerous Members Of The Starjammers" list.
 In 2021  Screen Rant ranked Rachel Summers 2nd in their "X-Men: The Top 10 Telepathic Mutants" list and 5th in their "X-Men: The 10 Most Powerful Members Of The Summers Family" list.
 In 2021, CBR.com ranked Rachel Summers 9th in their "10 Bravest Mutants in Marvel Comics" list.
 In 2022, Newsarama included Rachel Summers in their "20 X-Men characters that should make the jump from Marvel comics to the MCU" list. 
 In 2022, CBR.com ranked Rachel Summers 8th in their "10 Best Marvel Legacy Heroes" list.
 In 2022, Screen Rant ranked Rachel Summers 1st in their "10 Most Powerful Members Of Excalibur" list, 3rd in their "10 Most Powerful Alternate Universe Members Of The X-Men" list, and included her in their "10 Most Powerful X-Men" list and in their "10 Most Iconic Alternate Future X-Men" list.

Other versions
In the very first issue of the Uncanny X-Men story arc "Season of the Witch", Rachel and Psylocke were transported to the White Hot Room as an indirect result of the reality-shift performed by a mentally unstable Scarlet Witch. While there, it was established that the Rachel appearing in Earth-616 (originally from Earth-811) has no true alternate counterparts within the Marvel multiverse. Rather, all other incarnations of "Rachel Summers" that exist in parallel timelines (see below) are linked only by having the same name, or attributes.

House of M
The House of M reality had Rachel and Psylocke return to their dimension and thus be engrossed in the Scarlet Witch's reconstruction of the world. In this reality, Rachel was the bodyguard and traveling companion to Psylocke, who was crowned British royalty after her brother, Brian, became ruler of all England. Rachel then became involved with Captain Britain's mission to seal the breach in reality (rift) that was created by the Scarlet Witch's manipulations.

Variations of Days of Future Past
In at least three alternate future timelines derived from "Days of Future Past", a Rachel Summers married Franklin Richards and procreated mutant children. One such child was the time-traveling supervillain Hyperstorm (Jonathan Richards). Hyperstorm was responsible for causing the Fantastic Four to think that Mister Fantastic (Jonathan's grandfather) and Doctor Doom were dead; he was only defeated when he was trapped in another dimension by Galactus. The second child was Dream Summers, who possessed empathic superpowers. She was a superhero who appeared in the Spider-Man/X-Men: Time's Arrow trilogy of novels (although Marvel Comics novels tend to be considered non-canon). In a third reality, they produced a child named David Richards, who was rescued from a concentration camp by the interdimensional traveling Exiles and raised by the "Age of Apocalypse" version of Sabretooth. David's traumatic experiences at the camp motivated him to become a fanatical murderer.

In another variation of the "Days of Future Past", shown in Weapon X: Days of Future Now, a Rachel Summers was captured by Weapon X and detained in the "Neverland" concentration camp.

Exiles
In the so-called "Legacy Earth" reality of Exiles, in which the Legacy Virus mutated into a techno-organic plague, a Rachel Summers was a member of the Avengers, the last superhero group. At Morph's behest, she contacted Thor and the Asgardians to help them against the Vi-Locks, a race of beings infected with the techno-organic virus.

X-Men: The End
The miniseries X-Men: The End (written by Chris Claremont) details the last adventures of the X-Men in a possible future. In this reality, Rachel played a central role, and was the political campaign manager of Kitty Pryde (Chicago mayoral candidate). However, she abandoned this position after Cassandra Nova led a series of attacks on the X-Men and their allies. She traveled alongside Cable into Shi'ar space. After a Professor X was taken hostage by Nova, and she entered his psyche in order to free him. However, Nova traps her and Lilandra within. She seemingly kills them both, but Rachel used the power of the Phoenix to save herself and incapacitates Nova. They leave Xavier's mind and continue the battle in Rachel's mind, where Rachel is overpowered. Cassandra, using Rachel's body, kills Jean Grey and Cyclops, leaving Rachel forced to watch the ordeal. Nova then leaves Rachel's body, stealing the Phoenix force. The Phoenix being the only thing keeping her alive after her Cassandra destroyed her mental form, she simply died.

In other media

Television
 Rachel Summers (as Hound) had a non speaking cameo appearance in the mid-1990s X-Men animated television series. She can be seen in the multi-part storyline "Beyond Good and Evil" (Part 4) as one of Apocalypse's captive psychics.

Video games
 Rachel Summers (as Phoenix) made an appearance as a playable character in the 1990 role-playing PC game X-Men II: The Fall of the Mutants. During gameplay, the player had a choice of utilizing her "psi-flash" attack, where her Phoenix raptor would stun her opponents; or if her power was running low, a player could use Phoenix's fiery wings to cause physical damage. She was also one of the game's few flying characters alongside Marvel Girl (Jean Grey), Archangel and Rogue.
 Rachel Grey appears as a playable character in the iPad game X-Men: Battle of the Atom.
 Rachel Summers appears as playable character in Marvel Future Fight.

Miscellaneous
 Rachel Summers has been inducted into many Marvel/X-Men toylines. They include Hasbro, WizKids, and Diamond Select manufactured busts, action figurines (with variants), action packs, 2 inch double figurine packs, etc.

References

External links
 Marvel Girl (Rachel Summers) at Marvel.com
 Spotlight On... Marvel Girl III at UncannyXmen.Net
 Rachel-Summers.com
 Askani Rising
 The Phoenix Force

Characters created by Chris Claremont
Characters created by John Byrne (comics)
Characters created by John Romita Jr.
Comics characters introduced in 1981
Excalibur (comics)
Fictional avatars
Fictional bisexual females
Fictional characters displaced in time
Fictional characters from parallel universes
Fictional characters who can manipulate time
Fictional characters with spirit possession or body swapping abilities
Fictional empaths
Fictional swordfighters in comics
Marvel Comics American superheroes
Marvel Comics characters who have mental powers
Marvel Comics female superheroes
Marvel Comics LGBT superheroes
Marvel Comics mutants
Marvel Comics telekinetics
Marvel Comics telepaths
X-Men members